Michael Moroney (born 1950) is an Irish former hurler who played as a midfielder  for the Clare senior team.

Moroney made his debut for the team during the 1970 championship and was a semi-regular member of the starting fifteen until his retirement after the 1979 championship. During that time he won two National League winners' medals and one All-Star award.

At club level Moroney played with Crusheen.

References

1950 births
Living people
Crusheen hurlers
Clare inter-county hurlers
Munster inter-provincial hurlers